Paidin mac Lochlainn Ó Mailchonaire was an Irish poet who  died in 1506.

Ó Mailchonaire was a respected poet, and a member of the Ó Mailchonaire bardic family from Síol Muiredaigh (now central north County Roscommon).

The Annals of Ulster give his obituary as follows:

 Paidin Ua Mael-Conaire, unique choice of Ireland in poetry and in history, died of a fit, the night of Little Easter Monday.

The Annals of Lough Ce provide a little extra information:

 Páidín O'Maelchonaire, i.e. preceptor of the men of Erinn in poetry and history, died a sudden death this year—i.e. he lay down on his bed quite well, and was found dead in the morning.

External links
 http://www.ucc.ie/celt/published/T100010B/index.html
 http://www.irishtimes.com/ancestor/surname/index.cfm?fuseaction=Go.&UserID=

15th-century Irish poets
People from County Roscommon
Irish male poets
1506 deaths
Year of birth missing